trans-4-Hydroxycrotonic acid (T-HCA), also known as γ-hydroxycrotonic acid (GHC), is an agent used in scientific research to study the GHB receptor. It is an analogue of γ-hydroxybutyric acid (GHB), as well as an active metabolite of GHB. Similarly to GHB, T-HCA has been found to be endogenous to the rat central nervous system, and as a metabolite of GHB, is almost certain to be endogenous to humans as well. T-HCA binds to the high-affinity GHB receptor with 4-fold greater affinity than GHB itself, where it acts as an agonist, but does not bind to the low-affinity GHB binding site, the GABAB receptor. Because of this, T-HCA does not produce sedation. 
T-HCA has been shown to cause receptor activation-evoked increases in extracellular glutamate concentrations, notably in the hippocampus.

See also
 HOCPCA
 γ-Crotonolactone

References

Carboxylic acids
Convulsants
GHB receptor agonists
Neurotransmitters